The 1956 Iowa State Senate elections took place as part of the biennial 1956 United States elections. Iowa voters elected state senators in 29 of the state senate's 50 districts. State senators serve four-year terms in the Iowa State Senate.

A statewide map of the 50 state Senate districts in the year 1956 is provided by the Iowa General Assembly here.

The primary election on June 4, 1956 determined which candidates appeared on the November 6, 1956 general election ballot.

Following the previous election, Republicans had control of the Iowa state Senate with 44 seats to Democrats' 6 seats.

To claim control of the chamber from Republicans, the Democrats needed to net 20 Senate seats.

Republicans maintained control of the Iowa State Senate following the 1956 general election with the balance of power shifting to Republicans holding 40 seats and Democrats having 10 seats (a net gain of 4 seats for Democrats).

Summary of Results
Note: The 21 holdover Senators not up for re-election are not listed on this table.

Source:

Detailed Results
NOTE: The 21 districts that did not hold elections in 1956 are not listed here.

Note: The Iowa Secretary of State's website does not document any competitive intra-party primaries for state Senate races in 1956.

District 2

District 3

District 4

District 5

District 6

District 8

District 11

District 14

District 15

District 16

District 17

District 19

District 23

District 24

District 25

District 26

District 27

District 28

District 31

District 32

District 33

District 36

District 39

District 40

District 41

District 43

District 46

District 47

District 49

See also
 United States elections, 1956
 United States House of Representatives elections in Iowa, 1956
 Elections in Iowa

References

1956 Iowa elections
Iowa Senate
Iowa Senate elections